Bill Aulet is the Managing Director of the Martin Trust Center for MIT Entrepreneurship at MIT and Professor of the Practice at the MIT Sloan School of Management and MIT Sloan Executive Education. He is also the author of Disciplined Entrepreneurship: 24 Steps to a Successful Startup.

Career 

Since Aulet became Managing Director in 2009, he has conceived, designed and overseen the implementation of numerous innovative programs, from new courses (Linked Data Ventures, Entrepreneurial Product Marketing and Development, Energy Ventures, Applications of Advanced Entrepreneurial Techniques) and student initiatives (MIT Clean Energy Prize, MIT Entrepreneurship Review) to accelerators (Global Founders’ Skills Accelerator, Beehive Cooperative) and thought leadership initiatives (Regional Entrepreneurship Acceleration Program or REAP). In April 2013, Aulet was awarded the  Adolf F. Monosson Prize for Entrepreneurial Mentoring at MIT.

Prior to joining MIT, Aulet worked for more than a decade at IBM before launching a series of startups, including 3-D imaging company SensAble Technologies Inc.

His writings on entrepreneurship have been published by The Wall Street Journal, TechCrunch The Boston Globe, The Huffington Post, Xconomy, the Kauffman Foundation, MIT Sloan Experts, and the MIT Entrepreneurship Review.

Personal life 

A former professional basketball player, Aulet lives in Belmont, Massachusetts with his wife; they have four grown sons. Aulet holds a bachelor’s in engineering from Harvard University and an SM from the MIT Sloan School of Management.

Educational activities 

Bill Aulet teaches the MIT massive open online course (MOOC) on entrepreneurship: "Entrepreneurship 101: Who Is Your Customer?" and is Instructor at MIT Bootcamps.

References

External links 
 Martin Trust Center for MIT Entrepreneurship
 A Tale of Two Entrepreneurs: Understanding Differences in the Types of Entrepreneurship in the Economy
 "Teaching Entrepreneurship Is in the Startup Phase," Wall Street Journal
 "Startup Stories Are Great Narratives, But Not Blueprints for Success," Wall Street Journal
 "Driving Innovation In Large Corporations II: Three Case Studies," MIT Entrepreneurship Review
 "Entrepreneurship Development Program," MIT Sloan Executive Education, Professor of the Practice

MIT Sloan School of Management alumni
Harvard School of Engineering and Applied Sciences alumni
American chief financial officers
Living people
Year of birth missing (living people)
Place of birth missing (living people)
People from Belmont, Massachusetts